The 1904 Fordham football team was an American football team that represented Fordham University as an independent during the 1904 college football season. Fordham claims a 22–6 record, though College Football Data Warehouse (CFDW) lists the team's record as 4–1–1. 

Fred L. Smith was the coach for the second year. Fullback Edward Glennon was the captain.

Schedule
The following six games are reported in Fordham's media guide, CFDW, and contemporaneous press coverage.

The following are additional games reported in the Fordham media guide.

References

Fordham
Fordham Rams football seasons
Fordham football